Yitzhak Yonassi (also "Itzhak" and "Itzchak"; יצחק יונסי; born October 18, 1962) is an Israeli former Olympic sport shooter.

He was born in Ashkelon, Israel, and is Jewish.

Shooting career
He won at least one of the three shooting categories in the Israeli shooting championship every year from 1977 through 1991.

His coaches were Shlomo Goldstein and Yair-Henrik Dawidowich.

He competed for Israel at the 1984 Summer Olympics in Los Angeles, at the age of 21, in Shooting--Men's Air Rifle, 10 metres, and came in 8th (his 582 score was 5 points behind the bronze medalist, and established a new Israeli national record by 10 points), in Men's Small-Bore Rifle, Three Positions, 50 metres, and came in tied for 39th, and in Men's Small-Bore Rifle, Prone, 50 metres, and came in tied for 49th. He competed alongside his teacher, Yair Davidovitz.

He competed for Israel at the 1988 Summer Olympics in Seoul, at the age of 25, in Shooting--Men's Air Rifle, 10 metres, and came in tied for 29th, in Men's Small-Bore Rifle, Three Positions, 50 metres, and came in 43rd, and in Men's Small-Bore Rifle, Prone, 50 metres, and came in tied for 51st.

He is the President of the Israel Shooting Federation.

References

External links

Olympic shooters of Israel
1962 births
Israeli male sport shooters
Shooters at the 1988 Summer Olympics
Living people
Jewish sport shooters
Shooters at the 1984 Summer Olympics
People from Ashkelon